Erythrocharax altipinnis is a species of characid known only from Pará, Brazil, where it has been found in a small river. This species is the only known member of its genus.

Etymology 
The generic epithet is derived from the Greek erythrus (red) plus charax (a typical suffix for members of this family) in reference to the color of the caudal fin and the adipose fin of live specimens.  The specific epithet is derived from the Latin alti (long) and pinnis (fin), a reference to the males' long dorsal fin rays.

References

Characidae
Monotypic fish genera
Fish described in 2013